Tracey Walter (born November 25, 1947) is an American character actor. He has appeared in more than 170 films and television series.

Life and career
Walter was born and grew up in Jersey City, New Jersey, as the son of a truck driver. He attended St. Anthony's High School there and played basketball. He has a son and daughter.

He is known for his portrayal of "sidekicks" and "henchmen" such as Bob the Goon in Batman, Cookie in City Slickers, and Malak in Conan the Destroyer. He portrayed Frog Rothchild Jr. on the ABC sitcom Best of the West from 1981 to 1982.

Walter has acted in six Jonathan Demme films: Something Wild (1986), Married to the Mob (1988), The Silence of the Lambs (1991), Philadelphia (1993), Beloved (1998), and The Manchurian Candidate (2004). He has been directed by Danny DeVito in three films:  Matilda (1996), Death to Smoochy (2002), and Duplex (2003). He acted with and was directed by Jack Nicholson in The Two Jakes (1990). He and Nicholson have appeared in nine films together, beginning with Goin' South in 1978.

He appeared in a small role with Clint Eastwood in the 1982 film Honkytonk Man and has coined the phrase "Right Cheer" (as in right here) while playing a service station attendant, also attributed to Andy Griffith on his first comedy album What it Was, Was Football (1953). Walter also coined the phrase "Make 'Em Bounce" (as in happy) in the film Raggedy Man. His portrayal of Miller, the philosopher mechanic of Alex Cox's Repo Man, earned Walter a Saturn Award in 1985 for Best Supporting Actor. In the 2000 film Erin Brockovich, Walter played Charles Embry, the PG&E employee who supplied the memo that tied an executive at the PG&E corporate headquarters to the knowledge of the Hinkley station water contamination.

Walter's television credits include guest appearances on WKRP in Cincinnati, Taxi, Charlie's Angels, Hill Street Blues, Amazing Stories, Moonlighting, David Lynch's On the Air, Melrose Place, The Division, Veronica Mars, Criminal Minds and Cold Case. He appeared on Nash Bridges as Angel from 1996 to 2001 and on Reno 911! as Sheriff Walter Chechekevitch from 2003 to 2006.

Filmography

Film

Television

References

External links

Tracey Walter (Aveleyman)

1947 births
American male film actors
American male television actors
American male voice actors
Living people
Male actors from Jersey City, New Jersey
St. Anthony High School (New Jersey) alumni
20th-century American male actors
21st-century American male actors